is a Japanese voice actress employed by 81 Produce. She played Takao Kinomiya in Beyblade and Syaoran Li in Cardcaptor Sakura. From December 21, 2006 to October 2007, she had a hiatus from her career due to an illness requiring medical treatment.

Filmography

Television animation
1990s
 After War Gundam X (1996), Kid Salsamille
 YAT Anshin! Uchū Ryokō (1996), Gorō Hoshiwatari
 Flame of Recca (1997), Kaoru Koganei
 Pokémon (1997), Tarō
 Alice SOS (1998), Takashi Sagano
 Akihabara Dennō Gumi (1998), Tetsurō
 Cardcaptor Sakura (1998-2000), Syaoran Li
 Space Pirate Mito (1999), Sabu
 Detective Conan (1999), Toshiya (ep 129)
 Digimon Adventure (1999), Sukamon
 Karakurizōshi Ayatsuri Sakon (1999), Ukon the puppet

2000s
 Digimon Adventure 02 (2000), Sukamon
 Baby Felix (2000), Skippy
 Bakuten Shoot Beyblade (2001-2003), Takao Kinomiya
 Detective Conan (2001), Rintarō Koizumi (ep 225)
 X/1999 (2001), Nataku
 Inuyasha (2001), Tarōmaru (ep 27)
 Chobits (2002), Sumomo
 Gravion (2002), Kukki
 Pita-Ten (2002), Hiroshi Mitarai
 Shaman King (2002), Chocolove McDonell
 Ninja Scroll: The Series (2003), Takuma
 Papuwa (2003), Papuwa
 Gravion Zwei (2004), Kukki
 Kyo Kara Maoh! (2004), Greta
 Zatch Bell! (2004), Reycom
 Major (2004), Gorō Honda
 MÄR (2005), Ginta Toramizu
 Onegai My Melody (2005), Naomi
 Spider Riders (2006–07), Hunter Steele
 Allison & Lillia (2008), Wilhelm Schultz
 Soul Eater (2008), Ryōku
 Stitch! (2008), Yuna Kamihara
 Stitch! ~Itazura Alien no Daibōken~ (2009), Yuna

2010s
 Stitch! ~Zutto Saikō no Tomodachi~ (2010), Yuna
 HeartCatch PreCure! (2010), Coffret
 Kuragehime (2010), Banba
 Detective Conan (2011), Apollo Glass (ep 616-621)
 Pretty Rhythm: Aurora Dream (2011), Neko-chi, Itsuki Harune
 Yu-Gi-Oh! Zexal (2011), Shōbē Yuatsu/Cody Callus
 Gon (2012), Gon
 Hunter × Hunter (Second Series) (2012), Canaria
 Pokémon XY (2014), Nini/Nene
 Gintama (2015), Hattori Zenzou (Young)
 JoJo's Bizarre Adventure: Stardust Crusaders (2015), Boingo
 Digimon Universe: Appli Monsters (2016), Dokamon
 Cardcaptor Sakura: Clear Card (2018), Syaoran Li
 GeGeGe no Kitaro (2018), Jiromaru

2020s
 Motto! Majime ni Fumajime Kaiketsu Zorori (2020) - Noshishi
 Shaman King (2021), Chocolove McDonell

Unknown date
 Fushigi Yūgi (Young Tamahome)
 Kobato Keita Yoshimura
 Mirmo! (Sasuke/Sazo)
 Shin Megami Tensei: Devil Children (Takajo Zett)
 Ultraman: Super Fighter Legend (Kochan)
 Wedding Peach (Putrid)

Film animation
 Naruto Shippūden 2: Bonds  (2008) (Amaru)
 Pokémon: Arceus and the Jewel of Life (2009) (Kanta)
 Yo-kai Watch: Enma Daiō to Itsutsu no Monogatari da Nyan! (2015) (Takayuki)

OVA
 Amon: The Darkside of the Devilman (2000) (Tare-chan)
 Saint Young Men (2012) (Daisuke)

Video games
 Tokimeki Memorial 2 (Homura Akai)
 Final Fantasy X (Pacce)
 Ape Escape 2 (Hikaru/Jimmy)
Inuyasha (Tarōmaru)
 Final Fantasy X-2 (Pacce)
 J-Stars Victory VS (Taro Yamada)
 Dragon Quest Treasures (Erik)

Dubbing roles
Live-action
 3000 Miles to Graceland (Jesse)
 Anna and the King (Prince Chulalongkorn)
 Babe (NHK edition) (Babe)
 Bounce (Scott Janello)
 Boy Meets World (seasons 1 and 2) (Cornelius "Cory" A. Matthews)
 Children of Heaven (Ali)
 Gilmore Girls (Freddy)
 Growing Pains (season 4) (Benjamin "Ben" Hubert Horatio Humphrey Seaver)
 Honey (Benny)
 iCarly (Gibby Gibson)
 The Ice Storm (Sandy Carver)
 Jumanji (Fuji TV edition) (Billy Jessup)
 Liar Liar (Max Reed)
 Lost in Space (VHS/DVD/Blu-ray edition) (Will Robinson)
 Ma vie en rose (Jérôme)
 Music of the Heart (Nick)
 Screamers (David)
 Space Jam (Young Michael Jordan, Jeffrey Jordan)
 Speed 2: Cruise Control (Fuji TV edition) (Drew)
 Tooth Fairy (Randy Harris)

Animation
 Donkey Kong Country (Polly Roger)
 Dora the Explorer (TV Tokyo edition) (Dora Marquez, Sabrina, Snow Princess)
 My Little Pony: Equestria Girls (Spike)
 My Little Pony: Equestria Girls – Rainbow Rocks (Spike)
 My Little Pony: Friendship Is Magic (Spike)
 Transformers: Prime (Rafael Esquivel)

Other work
 Kumai and Yukana Nogami star in four adaptations for Clamp:
 in Cardcaptor Sakura, as Li Syaoran.
 in Chobits, as Sumomo.
 in X/1999, as Nataku.
 in Kobato, as Yoshimura Keita.
 She performed the 1st opening ("Go Ahead") for Beyblade G-revolution as well as the insert song in Cardcaptor Sakura EP 57 ("Ki ni Naru Aitsu")
 She has been in two anime based on manga by Nobuyuki Anzai:
 Flame of Recca as Kaoru Koganei
 Marchen Awakens Romance as Ginta Toramizu
 She has performed in Drama CDs, as well, playing the role of Edward in the Clock Tower Second Drama CD.

References

External links
 

1970 births
Living people
Japanese video game actresses
Japanese voice actresses
Voice actresses from Tokyo
20th-century Japanese actresses
21st-century Japanese actresses
81 Produce voice actors